Soriculus is a genus of shrew native to Asia. Along with several fossil species, the only extant member of the genus is the Himalayan shrew, as other extant species have now been transferred to other genera .

Taxonomy
The genus Soriculus is placed within the tribe Nectogalini. Formerly, this genus included several more extant species, but they have now been moved to other genera such as Chodsigoa and Episoriculus. Species from the extinct European genus Asoriculus were also included here at one point. Currently the genus contains the extinct species Soriculus kashmiriensis and Soriculus kubinyi, although in its description S. kashmiriensis was noted for being most closely related to species now placed in the genus Chodsigoa. DNA research has confirmed the close relationship of Soriculus with the recently extinct Asoriculus/Nesitotites shrews from Europe.

References

Mammal genera
Mammal genera with one living species
Taxa named by Edward Blyth